This is a list of Juken Sentai Gekiranger episodes.

Title color indicates central character: (red = Jyan or whole Gekiranger team, dark purple = Rio, yellow = Ran, blue = Retsu, green = Mele, violet = Gou, and orange = Ken).

Episodes


{| class="wikitable" width="98%"
|- style="border-bottom:8px solid #FFC800"style="border-bottom:8px solid #FF5F5F"
! width="4%" | Ep# !! Title !! Director !! Writer !! Original airdate
|-
|-|colspan=4 bgcolor=#e6e9ff|

Niki-Niki! Geki Jūken

|-|colspan=4 bgcolor=#e6e9ff|

Waki-Waki! Jūken Combination

|-|colspan=4 bgcolor=#e6e9ff|

Shio-Shio! Cleaning Power

|-|colspan=4 bgcolor=#e6e9ff|

Zowa-Zowa! The Five Venom-Ken

|-|colspan=4 bgcolor=#e6e9ff|

Uja-Uja! What Should I Do?

|-|colspan=4 bgcolor=#e6e9ff|

Juwān! What's That?

|-|colspan=4 bgcolor=#e6e9ff|

Shuba-Shuba Dancing!

|-|colspan=4 bgcolor=#e6e9ff|

Koto-Koto… Intently Koto-Koto

|-|colspan=4 bgcolor=#e6e9ff|

The Kena-Kena Woman

|-|colspan=4 bgcolor=#e6e9ff|

Jara-Jara Attack! The First Errand

|-|colspan=4 bgcolor=#e6e9ff|

Ukya-Ukya! Jūken Armament

|-|colspan=4 bgcolor=#e6e9ff|

Zowan-Zowan! Rin Jūken Training Starts

|-|colspan=4 bgcolor=#e6e9ff|

Shin-Shin! The Spirit's Dance

|-|colspan=4 bgcolor=#e6e9ff|

Netsu-Netsu! Forget the Technique

|-|colspan=4 bgcolor=#e6e9ff|

Howa-Howa! Mama Skills

|-|colspan=4 bgcolor=#e6e9ff|

Jiri-Jiri! Rin Jū Hall, Extracurricular Class

|-|colspan=4 bgcolor=#e6e9ff|

Goro-Goro! Teacher and Student Love

|-|colspan=4 bgcolor=#e6e9ff|

Sharkin-Kīn! The Body is Strong

|-|colspan=4 bgcolor=#e6e9ff|

Gokin-Gokin! Showdown with Rio

|-|colspan=4 bgcolor=#e6e9ff|

Gicho-Gicho! Triangle Opposition Match

|-|colspan=4 bgcolor=#e6e9ff|

Biki-Biki-Biki-Biki! Extremely Kageki 

|-|colspan=4 bgcolor=#e6e9ff|

Kyui-Kyui! Date with a Celebrity

|-|colspan=4 bgcolor=#e6e9ff|

Gure-Gure! Sukeban Captain

|-|colspan=4 bgcolor=#e6e9ff|

Garu-Garu! What's This, Little Brother!?

|-|colspan=4 bgcolor=#e6e9ff|

Hine-Hine! Just My Shigeki

|-|colspan=4 bgcolor=#e6e9ff|

Mohe-Mohe! Consulting your Worries

|-|colspan=4 bgcolor=#e6e9ff|

Beran-Beran! Burn, Commentator

|-|colspan=4 bgcolor=#e6e9ff|

With Bishi-Bishi Pikīn Osu!

|-|colspan=4 bgcolor=#e6e9ff|

Guda-Guda Here-Here! Shopping

|-|colspan=4 bgcolor=#e6e9ff|

The Sei-Sei and Dou-Dou Woman

|-|colspan=4 bgcolor=#e6e9ff|

We Muni-Muni!

|-|colspan=4 bgcolor=#e6e9ff|

Zowangi-Zowango! The Gathering, Beast Origin Village!

|-|colspan=4 bgcolor=#e6e9ff|

Fure-Fure Gatchiri! Kung Fu Chūshingura

|-|colspan=4 bgcolor=#e6e9ff|

Gowan-Gowan's Dain-Dain! Jūken Giant, Kenzan

|-|colspan=4 bgcolor=#e6e9ff|

Gyuon-Gyuon! Beast Power Bloom

|-|colspan=4 bgcolor=#e6e9ff|

Mukyu-Mukyu! The Three Thief Sisters

|-|colspan=4 bgcolor=#e6e9ff|

Gyan-Gyan! Useless Arranged Marriage Interview

|-|colspan=4 bgcolor=#e6e9ff|

Biba-Biba! Another Retu

|-|colspan=4 bgcolor=#e6e9ff|

Uro-Uro! The Children Don't Return

|-|colspan=4 bgcolor=#e6e9ff|

Head, Bakān! The Shocking Truth

|-|colspan=4 bgcolor=#e6e9ff|

Zushi-Zushi! No More

|-|colspan=4 bgcolor=#e6e9ff|

Wasshi-Wasshi Moving On!

|-|colspan=4 bgcolor=#e6e9ff|

Hapi-Hapi! Merry Christmas, Osu

|-|colspan=4 bgcolor=#e6e9ff|

Wafu-Wafu! Father's Melody

|-|colspan=4 bgcolor=#e6e9ff|

Pikīn! Showdown of Destiny

|-|colspan=4 bgcolor=#e6e9ff|

Gyawa-Gyawa Memories

|-|colspan=4 bgcolor=#e6e9ff|

Pika-Pika! My Path

|-|colspan=4 bgcolor=#e6e9ff|

Saba-Saba! Crucial Fist Judgement

|-|colspan=4 bgcolor=#e6e9ff|

Zun-Zun! Jūken Will Continue…

|}

References

See also

Juken Sentai Gekiranger